CIML is the initialism for the Centre d'immunologie de Marseille-Luminy.

CIML can also refer to:
Central Iowa Metro League, a high school athletic conference in Iowa
CIML community portal, virtual scientific  community for computational intelligence and machine learning 
CIML-FM, a radio station in Canada